Puppenspiel (German for "Doll Play") is the sixth studio album released by the Neue Deutsche Härte band  Unheilig. It was released on February 22, 2008, and, like Zelluloid and Moderne Zeiten before it, was released in two versions, a standard 14-track edition and a limited 16-track edition.

Track listing

Charts
 European Top 100 Albums - #56
 Media Control Charts - #13

2008 albums
Unheilig albums
German-language albums